Cavacha, also known as masini ya Kauka or machine ya Kauka, is a type of drum beat created by Meridjo Belobi. It is a fast-paced rhythm typically played on a drum kit, often with the snare drum or hi hat. Zairean bands such as Zaiko Langa Langa and Orchestra Shama Shama popularized this form of rhythm in the 1970s.

Cavacha was created in 1973 by the member of Zaiko Langa Langa, Meridjo Belobi. The idea came first from Meridjo Belobi during a train trip they took from Brazzaville to Pointe Noire, Congo Brazzaville. The singers of the band sang along the trip on the train rhythm. Back in Kinshasa, Meridjo proposed to the band that they should create some new music rhythm based on the sound of a train. Everybody agreed and worked on it. The result was the birth of cavacha. Locally in the Democratic Republic of Congo, the rhythm cavasha is called , meaning literally from Lingala: "The Engine of Kauka". Kauka is a neighbourhood in the city of Kinshasa that headquarter the transportation company Onatra, which operate ferries and trains.  means The Engine of Kauka. Because the sound that the rhythm cavasha produce, is similar and was created from the sound of a train.

Democratic Republic of the Congo music